The Supreme Council of Kazakhstan, was a unicameral legislative branch in Kazakhstan that existed from 1993 to 1995. The Supreme Council succeeded the Supreme Soviet of the Kazakh SSR after the new Constitution of Kazakhstan was adopted on 28 January 1993. During this period, the Supreme Council had its members elected in the 1994 Kazakh legislative election which was held for the first time in post-Soviet Kazakhstan. It existed to function until its dissolution on 11 March 1995 by a Presidential Decree after the Constitutional Court of Kazakhstan ruled in the favor Kazakhstani journalist Tatyana Kvyatkovskaya to nullify the results of the 1994 legislative election which she accused of being fraudulent. The Supreme Council was eventually by the Parliament of Kazakhstan in 1996 which was established after the 1995 Kazakh constitutional referendum.

List of chairmen

Chairmen of the Supreme Council 

 Serikbolsyn Abdildin (January 28, 1993 – December 13, 1993)

 Abish Kekilbayev (1994 – March 11, 1995)

Convocations 

 12th convocation (1990–1993)
 13th convocation (1994–1995)

References 

1993 establishments in Kazakhstan
1995 disestablishments in Kazakhstan
Defunct unicameral legislatures